Palais Chotek is a Baroque palace in Vienna, Austria. It is located at Währinger Straße 28 in the IX. district of Alsergrund. 

The building is named after the noble Chotek family. For over a century, it has been the headquarters of the Friedrich Otto Schmidt home furnishings company.

External links 

Chotek
Baroque architecture in Vienna
Buildings and structures in Alsergrund
Chotek family